Blood, Sweat & Tears 3 is the third album by the band Blood, Sweat & Tears, released in June 1970.

History
After the huge success of the previous album, Blood, Sweat & Tears 3 was highly anticipated and it rose quickly to the top of the US album chart. It contained two hit singles: an arrangement of Carole King's "Hi-De-Ho", and "Lucretia MacEvil", written by singer David Clayton-Thomas. As with their previous album, this one relied mostly on songs borrowed from outside writers. However, It received fewer favorable reviews.

Reception

Village Voice critic Robert Christgau panned David Clayton-Thomas's singing as "belching", while calling "Symphony for the Devil" a "pretty good rock and roll song revealed as a pseudohistorical middlebrow muddle when suite-ened." Allmusic's William Ruhlman called the album "a convincing, if not quite as impressive, companion to their previous hit. David Clayton-Thomas remained an enthusiastic blues shouter, and the band still managed to put together lively arrangements... although their pretentiousness, on the extended "Symphony/Sympathy for the Devil," and their tendency to borrow other artists' better-known material rather than generating more of their own, were warning signs for the future."

Track listing

Side One
"Hi-De-Ho" (Gerry Goffin, Carole King) – 4:27
"The Battle" (Dick Halligan, Steve Katz) – 2:41
"Lucretia MacEvil" (David Clayton-Thomas) – 3:04
"Lucretia's Reprise" (Blood, Sweat & Tears) – 2:35
"Fire and Rain" (James Taylor) – 4:03
"Lonesome Suzie" (Richard Manuel) – 4:36

Side Two
"Symphony for the Devil" (Dick Halligan) / "Sympathy for the Devil" (Mick Jagger, Keith Richards) – 7:49
"He's a Runner" (Laura Nyro) – 4:14
"Somethin' Comin' On" (Joe Cocker, Chris Stainton) – 4:33
"40,000 Headmen" (Steve Winwood, Jim Capaldi) – 4:44

Personnel
David Clayton-Thomas - lead vocals (all but 2)
Steve Katz - guitar, lead vocals (2), harmonica
Jim Fielder - bass guitar
Dick Halligan - organ, piano, electric piano, harpsichord, back vocals
Fred Lipsius - alto saxophone, piano, electric piano, music box, back vocals
Lew Soloff - trumpet, flugelhorn, piccolo trumpet
Chuck Winfield - trumpet, flugelhorn
Jerry Hyman - trombone, bass trombone, recorder, celeste, trombone, flute, alto flute, baritone horn
Bobby Colomby - drums, backing vocals, percussion

Production
Producers: Bobby Colomby, Roy Halee
Engineers: Roy Halee, Lou Waxman
Arrangers: David Clayton-Thomas, Bobby Colomby, Jim Fielder, Dick Halligan, Fred Lipsius
Design: John Berg
Photography: Lee Friedlander, Melissa Katz, Fred Lombardi

Charts
Album - Billboard (United States)

Singles - Billboard (United States)

References

Blood, Sweat & Tears albums
1970 albums
Albums produced by Roy Halee
Columbia Records albums
Albums produced by Bobby Colomby